South of the Circle is an adventure video game developed by State of Play Games. The game follows Peter, a British climate scientist who is stranded in Antarctica during the Cold War. The game was first released for Apple Arcade in October 2020. 11 Bit Studios released the game for PC and consoles in August 2022. Anton Lesser, Adrian Rawlins, Olivia Vinall, Gwilym Lee, Richard Goulding, and Michael Fox provided voice and motion capture for the game's cast. South of the Circle received generally positive reviews upon release.

Gameplay
South of the Circle is a linear adventure video game played from third-person perspective. In the game, the player assumes control of Peter, a researcher and climatologist at Cambridge University during the Cold War. Players spent most of the time engaging in conversations with non-playable characters, and players can choose Peter's responses to other characters by selecting symbols representing emotions that appear above Peter's head on-screen. If the player does not select any options, the game will automatically select a response for the player. Some dialogue options may change the outcomes of the game.

Plot
The game follows Peter, a British climate scientist who was stranded in Antarctica following a plane crash in 1964. As he attempts to find his way to escape, the memories of his life before his journey to Antarctica begin to unwind before him.

Development

The game was developed by State of Play Games, the creator of Lumino City. It was influenced by other adventure games such as Firewatch and What Remains of Edith Finch. The Antarctica setting stemmed was inspired by the novel The Amazing Adventures of Kavalier & Clay, which features a scene in which two supposed enemies meeting each other in the desolate Antarctica during World War II. Originally the team wanted to create a game about great explorers visiting Antarctica in the 1930s, though this idea was subsequently scrapped. The team obtained photos of Faraday Station during the 1960s from a mutual friend, and went to King George Island in southern Chile to perform research for the game. The game features a minimalistic artstyle. The artstyle was inspired by screen prints during that period. According to Whittaker, he wanted an artstyle "evocative of the mid-century period in which the game was set". The game was powered by Unity.

Anton Lesser, Adrian Rawlins, Olivia Vinall, Gwilym Lee, Richard Goulding, and Michael Fox provided voice and motion capture for the game's cast. The team introduced emotional icons as a way to select conversational options. This was an attempt by the team to establish an emotional connection between the player, the protagonist, and other non-playable characters in the game. While the story explores the life of Peter before and during his adventure in Antarctica, the game also explores other themes such as masculinity, denial, isolation and reliability of memories. The geopolitical tension in Antarctica during the Cold War, and the Antarctica Treaty were also a significant part of the game's narrative.

South of the Circle was announced in September 2020 by State of Play Games. It was released for iOS as an Apple Arcade game on October 30, 2022. PC and console versions of the game was announced by State of Play Games and publisher 11 Bit Studios in April 2022. The game was released for Windows PC, PlayStation 4, PlayStation 5, Nintendo Switch, Xbox One and Xbox Series X and Series S on August 3, 2022.

Reception
According to review aggregator Metacritic, the iOS version of the game received "generally positive" reviews, while the PlayStation 5 version of the game received "mixed or average" reviews. Many critics praised the game's minimalistic artstyle and mature themes as well as the performance of the cast. Some remarked that the experience was light on traditional gameplay, noted its general lack of interactivity, and expressed their disappointment that the choices players made in the game had minimal impact on the story.

References

External links
 
 The making of South of the Circle

Adventure games
2020 video games
Video games set in Antarctica
Video games set in 1964
Cold War video games
Interactive movie video games
Apple Arcade games
Windows games
MacOS games
PlayStation 4 games
PlayStation 5 games
Xbox One games
Xbox Series X and Series S games
Nintendo Switch games
11 bit studios games
Single-player video games
State of Play Games games